The National Center for Public Policy Research, founded in 1982, is a self-described conservative think tank in the United States. Its founding CEO was Amy Ridenour, who was chairwoman. David A. Ridenour, her husband, is president, having served as vice president from 1986-2011.

Policy areas
NCPPR's work is in the areas of free markets, environmental and regulatory policy, retirement security, constitutional law, the First and Second Amendments, religious liberty, academic freedom, defense and foreign affairs.  Particular areas of interest include global warming denial, endangered species, energy policy, environmental justice, job growth and economic prosperity, property rights, legal reform, health care, Medicare reform, Social Security, civil rights, foreign affairs/defense and United Nations reform/withdrawal.

National Center for Public Policy Research is repeatedly cited as a member of the global warming denial organization Cooler Heads Coalition, which describes its object as "dispelling the myths of global warming by exposing flawed economic, scientific, and risk analysis", but reported on its blog in 2013 that it has not been a member for many years.

Publications
Publications include National Policy Analysis papers, Talking Points cards, the newsletters What Conservatives Think, Ten Second Response and In the News among other publications, and a National Center Blog. They also have full editorial control over the contents of the wiki-styled web portal GroupSnoop which hosts conservative analyses of various high-profile left-leaning non-profits. NCPPR also hosts a global warming denial website envirotruth.com, that provides information on environmental issues with emphasis on property rights. The site was launched in May 2002.

Funding
As of October 31, 2013, the organization's web site reported that its funding breakdown was 94% from individuals, 4% from foundations and less than 2% from corporations.  The organization reported receiving 350,000 individual contributions a year from over 96,000 recent contributors.

For the fiscal year ending 12/31/14, the organization's 990 tax return reported revenue of $11,458,636 and expenses of $11,636,451. It reported receiving no government grants.

Project 21
Since 1992, the group has sponsored Project 21, a "national leadership network of black conservatives".  Project 21 provides research and commentary on public policy issues from a conservative black perspective to the U.S. news media at large and to African American community newspapers and media outlets.  According to the organization, Project 21 members, all of whom are black, were published, quoted or interviewed over 35,000 times on a variety of public policy issues since 1992, including on major cable TV programs such as the Fox News Channel's The O'Reilly Factor, The Kelly File, Fox & Friends and The Sean Hannity Shows, and MSNBC's Hardball with Chris Matthews, as well as major syndicated radio programs including the Michael Savage, Sean Hannity, Mike Siegel and Bill Martinez shows.

Edmund Peterson was the first chairman of Project 21.  It was also formerly chaired by Mychal Massie. It is now co-chaired by Horace Cooper and Cherlyn Harley LeBon. Fox News Contributor Deneen Borelli served as Project 21's first full-time senior fellow from 2006-2012.

Of Project 21, the liberal magazine The Nation said in May 2005, "Project 21 remains a crucial gear in the right’s propaganda factory. Without [Project 21, its] cadres would probably be at home screaming at the TV.  But instead, they’re on TV."

Project 21's Jimmie Hollis claims to have attended the November 1963 March on Washington for Jobs and Freedom, hearing Martin Luther King Jr.'s "I Have a Dream" speech first-hand. He shared some on his recollections in an audio interview conducted with Project 21 on August 26, 2013.

Staff and directors
The board of directors includes author Peter Schweizer, management consultant Victor Porlier, health care analyst Edmund F. Haislmaier, legal commentator Horace Cooper, Young America's Foundation CEO Ron Robinson, Amy Ridenour, and David Ridenour.

Key staff as of 2016 included Jeff Stier, who runs its Risk Analysis Division, Justin Danhof, who runs its Free Enterprise Project, Horace Cooper and Cherylyn Harley LeBon, who run its Project 21, Senior Fellows David Almasi, R.J. Smith, and Bonner Cohen, Distinguished Fellow Deroy Murdock, Media Director Judy Kent and Digital Media Specialist Jennifer Biddison. Bishop Council Nedd II, Joe R. Hicks, Stacy Washington, Demetrius Minor, Emery McClendon, Niger Innis, Dr. Elaina George, Dr. Day Gardner, Nadra Enzi, Dutch Martin, Kevin Martin and Christopher Arps are among those who frequently speak or publish under the Project 21 and/or National Center banner.

Notable Associates of the NCPPR

The following individuals have affiliations with the National Center for Public Policy Research.

 Peter N. Kirsanow, attorney and a member of the U.S. Commission on Civil Rights. Serves on the advisory board of the NCPPR.
 Joe Roche, Iraq war veteran and adjunct fellow at the National Center for Public Policy Research.

Critics

In February 2014, at Apple Inc.'s annual shareholder meeting, a proposal by the NCPPR as a shareholder to force Apple to "disclose the costs of its sustainability programs" was rejected by 97% vote. The NCPPR representative argued that Apple's decision to have all of its power come from green sources would lower shareholders' profits. CEO Tim Cook "categorically rejected the worldview behind the NCPPR's advocacy. He said that there are many things Apple does because they are right and just, and that a return on investment (ROI) was not the primary consideration on such issues...When we work on making our devices accessible by the blind, I don't consider the bloody ROI... If you want me to do things only for ROI reasons, you should get out of this stock." Virgin's CEO Richard Branson wrote an article supporting Cook's stance and criticizing the NCPPR stance on climate change. Branson argued that "If 97% of climate scientists agreeing that climate-warming trends over the past century are due to human activities isn’t compelling data, I don’t know what is." An article in the San Francisco Chronicle in 1998 described the NCPPR's "legal but controversial" computer-generated "fright mail" campaign which targeted millions of seniors, according to the American Association of Retired Persons spokesman, Greg Marchildon.

Controversies

Disgraced lobbyist Jack Abramoff was a member of NCPPR's Board of Directors; he resigned in October 2004 after NCPPR's Board of Directors concluded he had violated the organization's conflict of interest policy. In October 2002, Abramoff directed the Mississippi Band of Choctaws to give $1 million to NCPPR, and then told Amy Ridenour to distribute the funds to Capital Athletic Foundation ($450,000), Capitol Campaign Strategies ($500,000) and Nurnberger and Associates ($50,000). In June 2003, Greenberg Traurig, the firm that employed Abramoff, sent $1.5 million to NCPPR, of which Ridenour distributed $250,000 to Capital Athletic Foundation and the remainder to Kay Gold LLC, both controlled by Abramoff. Ridenour said in testimony that she believed Abramoff co-conspirator Michael Scanlon was the owner of Kay Gold (Kaygold).

References

Further reading
People for the American Way's Right Wing Watch: Project 21 - A Laughable Attempt to Redefine "Civil Rights"
"Tom DeLay's Right Arm", Media Transparency
 "After critical article, conservative nonprofit accuses Raw Story of violating copyright", Raw Story, March 3, 2006

External links
 Official site
 Organizational Profile – National Center for Charitable Statistics (Urban Institute)
 Amy Ridenour's National Center Blog
  Project 21 Official site

Political and economic think tanks in the United States
Organizations based in Washington, D.C.
Organizations of environmentalism skeptics and critics